Blairtown is an unincorporated community in Sweetwater County, Wyoming, United States. It is located near Rock Springs.

Industry
Many key industries are located here, including Halliburton and Schlumberger. This is a stretch of road that intersects with U.S. Route 191.

History
This town was actually a mining area before it became a town. It was started by the Blair Brothers back in the 1860s. It has its own park and is located near a set of Union Pacific Railroad.

Notes

Unincorporated communities in Sweetwater County, Wyoming
Unincorporated communities in Wyoming